Rapture for the Geeks: When AI Outsmarts IQ (2009) is a non-fiction book by American Law Professor Richard Dooling. The book provides an alarming window into a hypothetical future technological singularity, where machine intelligence outstrips human intelligence. The book also provides a historical review of man's relationship with machines, including dangers caused by other technologies such as nuclear weaponry.

See also
 Technological singularity

References

2008 non-fiction books
Artificial intelligence publications
Books about existential risk
Futurology books